Shahrdad Rohani, also known as Shardad Rohani (born 27 May 1954) is an Iranian-American composer, violinist/pianist, and conductor. His style is contemporary and he is well known for composing and conducting classical, instrumental, adult contemporary/new age, film soundtrack as well as pop music. He has been the principal conductor and music director of the Tehran Symphony Orchestra since 2016.

Early life 
He was born in 1954 in Rasht, Iran. His father, Reza Rohani, was an accomplished musician and as a result, Shahrdad and all of his brothers including Anoushiravan Rohani and Ardeshir Rohani followed in their father's footsteps. He began playing the piano at age 6, like many of his other brothers. As a child, he was a student to a well-known Persian violinist, Ebrahim Rouhifar. At age 10 he attended the Persian National Music Conservatory of Tehran. By 1975, he was studying Composition and Orchestra Conducting at the University of Music and Performing Arts Vienna. In 1984, Rohani moved to Los Angeles.

Musical career 

From 1987 until 1991, Rohani served as the music director and conductor of the Committee on the Arts (COTA) symphony orchestra in Los Angeles. He has appeared as a guest conductor with a number of prestigious orchestras including London's Royal Philharmonic Orchestra, Minnesota Orchestra, Colorado Symphony Orchestra, San Diego Symphony, Indianapolis Symphony Orchestra, New Jersey Symphony, Zagreb Philharmonic Orchestra, the American Youth Philharmonic Orchestras and many others.

Rohani arranged and conducted a sixty piece orchestra to supplement Yanni's keyboard compositions during the Yanni Live at the Acropolis concert in 1993 - an open-air concert with the London Royal Philharmonic Concert Orchestra on the Acropolis, Athens, Greece. Rohani also played the violin on all but two of the tracks during this concert. Yanni Live at the Acropolis was acclaimed by both critics and audience and became the most widely viewed program ever shown on Public Television in United States and is the second best-selling music video of all time.

In 1994, he became a US citizen.

Rohani was commissioned in 1998 by the government of Thailand and the committee of the 13th Asian Games to compose and conduct the music for opening ceremonies. The composition became the most popular song of the Asian Games.

Discography

Solo albums

Compilation and guest artist albums

Awards 
 A.K.M. Scholarship (Vienna, Austria)
 ASCAP Scholarship (Los Angeles, California)
  1984 – Jerry Fielding Award, UCLA
 1999 – 'Pikanes Award' by the Musical Association of Thailand

See also
 List of Iranian musicians
 Music of Iran
 Persian pop music

References

External links

Shardad at Serenity Music
 

Iranian conductors (music)
Iranian composers
Iranian pianists
Iranian violinists
Living people
University of Music and Performing Arts Vienna alumni
Iranian emigrants to the United States
1954 births
21st-century conductors (music)
21st-century pianists
21st-century violinists
Barbad award winners